Blu is the pseudonym of an Italian artist who conceals his real identity. He was born in Senigallia. He lives in Bologna and has been active in street art since 1999.

Places

Central and South America

Blu's nomadic spirit reached its peak in 2005. From the end of that year Blu spent most of his time jumping around in self-guided travels, linking his itineraries to the festivals to which he was invited. At that time, he collaborated with Ericailcane and several artists from Costa Rica, Nicaragua, Guatemala, and Honduras in a festival in Managua called "Murales de Octubre." On that occasion he painted a wall, significant in the history of South American murals, on the Avenida Bolivar where, in 1979, Victor Canifrù celebrated the Sandinista revolution. With this he achieved one of his most imposing murals which was immediately dubbed Hombre Banano (Banana Man) by the locals, referring to the protest of the workers on banana plantations.

The following year, from October 2006 to December 2006, he returned to Central and South America for a long circuit of murals that included Mexico City, Guatemala City, Managua, San José (Costa Rica), and finally, Buenos Aires (Argentina). He was followed during the trip by filmmaker Lorenzo Fonda, who documented the experience and turned it into the documentary film Megunica, for which Blu created a series of animated segments using digital software. The film also includes the first documented painted stop-motion animation by Blu. A year later he was again in South America, in São Paulo, Brazil, participating in the festival "A Conquista do Espaço" (Conquering Space). On that occasion he came up with a new interpretation of the "Christ of Corcovado" of Rio de Janeiro. In Blu's version Christ is literally submerged by tons of guns and rifles.
From the Fall of 2007 to the Spring of 2008, he lived in Buenos Aires, devoting all his efforts to the creation of a video called Muto (Silent). In addition to receiving many international awards, such as the Grand Prix 2009 from the Festival of Clermont-Ferrand, "Muto" has been seen by 12 million-plus viewers on YouTube. It is also available in high definition on Blu's website under the Creative Commons license. This video is composed of hundreds of paintings on walls, made throughout many streets of Buenos Aires and, frame by frame, creates more than seven minutes of an animated mural.

In 2009 Blu started his umpteenth tour around South America visiting Bogotá for the festival "Memoria Canalla", then to Montevideo, Uruguay, back to Buenos Aires and, for the first time, to Lima, Peru, where he painted the entire façade of an historical building in the central Avenida Arenales. In this huge mural Blu seems to reinterpret the history of South America, a continent that has been violated by both ancient and modern conquistadores.

In 2013 he participated in the Bienal de Arte Urbano (BAU) in Cochabamba, Bolivia.

North America
In 2008 Blu accepted an invitation from the Deitch Gallery in New York to paint the exterior of their Long Island location.
After being invited by the Museum of Contemporary Art, Los Angeles to paint an exterior wall of the museum for its "Art in the Street" exhibition, its director Jeffrey Deitch ordered the resulting mural to be whitewashed the day after it was finished, probably due to its political content. The mural represented two rows of coffins each draped with a one-dollar bill in place of the American flag.

West Bank
In 2007, Santa's Ghetto, a London-based art collective which organizes annual happenings of painting performances and print trade fairs, invited Blu to a festival that took place in the West Bank. Blu was part of a group of artists, including Banksy, Mark Jenkins, Ron English, Swoon, and Faile who painted on the wall around Bethlehem that separates the West Bank from Israel. On a watchtower border Blu painted a figure of a person trying to tear down the walls with his finger.

Europe

Austria

In 2010 Blu was invited to Vienna to paint a mural at the Danube River harbour near Albern in the city district of Simmering. 
First suggested in 1923 as one possibility for the expansion of Vienna's harbour facilities, Albern was selected for realisation by the German Reich Ministry of Transport (Reichsverkehrsministerium) in 1939, a year after the "Anschluss" of Austria to Nazi Germany. The project was to serve as a logistic node of a future geo- and biopolitical order, designated for the transshipment of grain from the annexed or economically colonized regions of eastern and south-eastern Europe to the heartlands of the German Reich. For the construction of the harbour basin and its five granaries between 1939 and 1942 the Nazi regime employed forced labour. Realized on one of the granaries, Blu's mural called upon the overdue historical and social commemoration of the place's charged history and the unknown fates of the forced labourers who built it. The commissioned piece was destroyed in autumn 2013 in the course of renovation works.

England
In 2007, Blu went to London for the first time where he made many pieces around Camden Town and Willow Street, and at the former headquarters of art-gallery website Pictures on Walls. That same summer he took part in a two-man exhibit with Ericailcane at the Lazarides Gallery. The following year, the Tate Modern presented an exhibition on the phenomenon of street art and invited Blu, along with JR, Faile, Sixeart, and Os Gêmeos e Nunca, to paint its entire main façade.

Germany

Blu worked in Germany on many occasions between 2006 and 2009, mostly in Berlin, and always around Cuvrystraße in a multi-ethnic neighborhood called Kreuzberg. Thanks to his participation in several of the festivals "Backjump" and "Planetprozess," he had the opportunity to create some of his works, one of which was painted in combination with gigantic photos by the French artist JR.

In 2006, during one of these trips, Blu made his first digital animation from images painted directly on a wall, a technique that would be a recurrent theme of many of his future videos such as "Muto."

In consultation with Blu the two murals at Cuvrystraße were covered with black paint in 2014 by a group of people as a sign of discontent with the city's urban development policies in the area.

Italy
Italy, above any other country, can boast of having the majority of Blu's graffiti, both illegal and legal. Among the public projects worth noting are the façade of PAC (the Contemporary Art Pavilion) in Milan, finished in 2008; the murals in that city's Bicocca and Lambrate train stations, done in 2008 and in 2009; three editions of "Spina Festival" in Comacchio (2005, 2006 and 2007); two editions of "Fame Festival a Grottaglie" (2008 and 2009). In this last one, Blu completed a video-animation with the New York-based artist, David Ellis. Blu has also taken part in many editions of the festival "Icone" in Modena and in Ancona's "Festival Pop Up" in 2008 where he painted along with Ericailcane a gigantic silos next to the harbor waterfront. Other Italian cities where Blu has left his mark are varied, among which are Prato, Florence, Grosseto, Turin, Ancona, Rovereto, Verona and Pesaro.
In Bologna there were most of his first works because of his studies in the city's University. In 2016 he deleted all murals painted in Bologna due to the decision taken by the municipality who made an exhibition trying to profit from Blu's graffiti without his permission.

Blu has also painted in several "Centri Sociali", places that are between squats and self-managed cultural centers. In Bologna his work is visible at XM24, TPO, Livello 57, Crash; in Rome at Forte Prenestino and Collatino; in Milan at Cox 18 and Leoncavallo and in Pisa at Cantiere San Bernardo.

Spain

Blu has frequently visited Spain. At the festival "Segundo Asalto" in Zaragoza, he, along with the artists San, Eltono, Nuria, and Nano, painted a mural of a colossal minotaur picking up an astonished man. Blu's murals can also be found in Valencia, Linares, Madrid and Barcelona. In Barcelona's Barrio Carmelo neighborhood, Blu took part in the 2008 edition of the festival "The Influencers". With the global economic crisis looming, Blu painted a threatening shark whose skin is completely covered in euro bills.

Censored in US
 He was invited in Los Angeles for the exhibition "Art in the Streets" but his work on the side of the Geffen Contemporary Wing of MOCA was censored.

Bibliography
 Backjumps (2007). The Live Issue #3: Urban Communication and Aesthetics, William Stratmann, ISBN 978-3-937946-27-6
 Dietrich, Lucas (2009). 60: Innovators Shaping Our Creative Future, Thames & Hudson.
 Hundertmark, Christian (2006). The Art of Rebellion 2: World of Urban Art Activism (No. 2)
 Iosifidis, Kiriakos (2009). Mural Art, Volume 2: Murals on Huge Public Surfaces Around the World from Graffiti to Trompe L'Oeil, Gingko Press.
 Lazarides, Steve (2009). Outsiders: Art by People Lewisohn, Cedar, editor (2008). Street Art: The Graffiti Revolution, HNA Books.
 Manco, Tristan (2007). Street Sketchbook: Inside the Journals of International Street and Graffiti Artists, Chronicle Books.
 Tschiedl, Roman (2014). BLU - Untitled/it is obvious, In: Taig, Maria [Ed.]: Kör vie 07-10: Public art Vienna 2007 - 2010, Verlag für moderne Kunst

Editions
 Blu (2018). Minima muralia, Special edition, Zooo Print and Press
 Blu (2018). Minima muralia, Zooo Print and Press
 Blu (2008). Blu 2004-2007, Studio Cromie
 Blu (2006). Nulla, Zooo Print and Press.
 Blu (2005). 25 disegni (with Ericailcane)'', Zooo Print and Press.

References

External links 

 buenosairesstreetart.com: Blu
 Blu

Italian graffiti artists
Living people
People from Senigallia
Anonymous artists
Pseudonymous artists
Year of birth missing (living people)